Cross Lake First Nation ( or  'Otter People') is a band of Cree First Nations people in Canada governed under the Indian Act.  Its members occupy several reserves within the town of Cross Lake situated on the east shore of Cross Lake in the province of Manitoba.  In October 2008, its recorded registered membership was 6,969, of which 4,953 people of this First Nation lived on their reserve.  Cross Lake is the principal community of the Pimicikamak indigenous people that made treaty with the British Crown in 1875.  Its indigenous language is Woods Cree. Cross Lake was the site of a residential school operated under Canada's assimilation policy. In 2008, Prime Minister Stephen Harper apologized for the damage caused by this policy.

In March 2016, Cross Lake appeared in the national news after its officials declared a state of emergency because of an epidemic of suicides. The Canadian Press reported that there had been "six suicides in the last two months", and band councillor Donnie McKay said the community "is traumatized and needs immediate help from the provincial and federal governments".

Demographics 

As of August 2014 Cross Lake First Nation had a total registered membership of 8,034 with 5,642 members living on-reserve.

Governance 
Under the Indian Act, Cross Lake First Nation has a municipal government with a Band Council.  Since 1999, the Band Council is no longer elected under the Indian Act. The Executive Council of Pimicikamak sits ex officio as the Council of the Band but continues to be the agent of the Minister of Indian Affairs for delivering programs to band members on reserve.

Chief and Council 
Chief and Councillors are appointed under the Custom Electoral System. In their council a quorum of 5 members is needed.

Chief
 Chief Cathy Merrick
 Principal Spokesperson of the Nation
 Primary Intergovernmental Affairs
 Government Relations
 International Relations

Council
 Councillor 
 Northern Flood Agreement
 All Northern Flood Agreement Claims/Matters
 Reserve Lands
 Natural Resources
Member of the Financial Management Board
Executive Council Relations
 Councillor
 Justice Restoration
 Justice
 Band Constables
 RCMP
 Courts
 Corrections
 Gaming
 Elders Council Liaison
 Councillor 
 Housing
 Education
 Culture & Heritage
 Cree Language
 Councillor Donnie Mckay
 Health
 Economic Development
 Public Works
 Highways & Transportation
 Midnorth Development Corporation
 Ponton
 Arena Trust
Member of the Financial Management Board

 Councillor 
 Communications
 MCTV
 CFNC
 Cell Phone/Internet
 Taxation
 Recreation
 Youth Council Liaison
 Men's Wellness
 Councillor Shirley Robinson
 Finance
 Band Administration
 Pathways
 Employmnet & Training
 Mining
Chair of the Financial Management Board
 Councillor  
 Aboriginal Headstart Program
 Day Care
 Muchipuniwin Program
 PCN Campaign
 Women's Council Liaison
 Councillor Grace Ross
 Welfare
 Old Folks Home
 Awasis Agency (Cross Lake)
 Membership/Citizenship
 PCN Laws Amendments
 New Proposed PCN Laws

Reserves 
Cross Lake First Nation have reserved for themselves several tracts of land as their reserve holdings. Their largest reserve is the  Cross Lake 19 Reserve. Associated with this reserve are:
 Cross Lake 19A Reserve
 Cross Lake 19B Reserve
 Cross Lake 19C Reserve
 Cross Lake 19D Reserve
 Cross Lake 19E Reserve
 Cross Lake 19X01 Reserve
 Cross Lake 19X02 Reserve
 Cross Lake 19X03 Reserve
 Cross Lake 19X05 Reserve
 Cross Lake 19X06 Reserve
 Whiskeyjack Reserve

Community 
Cross Lake, Manitoba is the principal community for the Cross Lake First Nation. Other major communities for the First Nation are:
 Pikwitonei, Manitoba
 Thicket Portage, Manitoba
 Wabowden, Manitoba

Child protection 
Cross Lake was the site of a residential school operated under Canada's aboriginal assimilation policy. In 2008, Prime Minister Stephen Harper apologized for the "profoundly negative" consequences of this policy.  Cross Lake has its own child welfare mandate and operates under the name Nikan Awasisak Agency Inc. with sub offices both in Thompson and Winnipeg for aboriginal child protection on reserve.

Highway connection 

Cross Lake is the only community in north-eastern Manitoba that is connected to the North American highway system by all-weather road via the C$24 M Kichi Sipi Bridge, which the Province of Manitoba built after losing a lawsuit.

Education 
The Cross Lake Education Authority is legally part of the Cross Lake First Nation but is operated by an independent elected Board.  It runs two schools on the Cross Lake First Nation's reserves. Otter Nelson River School is a Sr. 1-4 High School and also an Elementary school (N-4). Mikisew Middle School is a school with grades 5–8.

Notes

External links
AANDC profile
Map of Cross Lake 19 at Statcan
Map of Cross Lake 19A at Statcan
Map of Cross Lake 19E at Statcan

First Nations governments in Manitoba
Cree governments